The Richland Historic District is a historic district in Richland, Georgia that was listed on the National Register of Historic Places (NRHP) in 1986.  It includes the historic commercial center of Richland and residential areas around it.  Architectural styles of houses, commercial buildings, and institutional buildings in the district include Greek Revival, Victorian Eclectic, Neoclassical, and Craftsman/Bungalow.

The district includes the Smith-Alston House, which is separately listed on the NRHP.

Contributing Properties

References

Historic districts on the National Register of Historic Places in Georgia (U.S. state)
Geography of Stewart County, Georgia
National Register of Historic Places in Stewart County, Georgia